Maria Elisabeth, Countess of Schlick (21 January 1790 – 14 December 1855) was a Bohemian-born German composer and poet. She composed music for lieder and also wrote poetry that other composers set to music. She published under the name Countess Elise Schlick or Gräfin Elise Schlick. Although Schlick is often described as German, some sources list her birthplace as Prague and her birth year as 1792. 

Little is known about Schlick’s early life or education. She was the sister-in-law of Count Franz zu Bassano und Weisskirchen, an Austrian general who helped suppress the Hungarian uprising in 1849. She was described as a patroness of Franz Liszt in Prague. 

Schlick produced compositions through at least opus 5. Her musical compositions were published by Franz Gloggl and C. A. Spina in Vienna; August Cranz in Hamburg; and Schott in Mainz. Her musical compositions and poetry included:

Music 
"Geisternacht" 
"Gute Nacht" 
"Lieb Liebchen, leg's Händchen aufs Herze," opus 5 (text by Heinrich Heine)
"Lieder der Nacht"

Poetry 
"Die Lüfte weh'n so lind" (music by Conradin Kreutzer
"Du frische Saat, heraus/Frühlingsfreude" (music by Amalie Scholl)
"Glaubet nicht es wären Tränen" (music by Jan Bedřich Kittl)

References 

1790 births
1855 deaths
Women composers
Musicians from Prague